Nicole Gale Anderson (born August 29, 1990) is an American actress. She is best known for her role as Heather Chandler on The CW series Beauty & the Beast. She is also known for her roles as Macy Misa in the Disney Channel series Jonas and as Kelly Parker and Miranda Collins respectively on the ABC Family shows Make It or Break It and Ravenswood.

Early life
Anderson was born in Rochester, Indiana. Her father is an American who served as a Commander in the United States Navy, and her mother is of Filipino ethnicity. As a child, she won national gymnastics competitions, but retired due to injuries. Anderson was awarded a scholarship to Georgia's Barbizon Modeling and Acting School at age 13. She then began to study acting and attending auditions. She landed several print ads and television commercials, including Mary-Kate & Ashley Online Clothing, Every Girl, Stand Up, and Bratz Pretty 'n' Punk & Treasures.

Career
She auditioned for the role of Stella in the television series Jonas, but actress Chelsea Kane ended up winning the role. After the series plot changed, producers decided to create a best friend for Stella and offered Anderson the role of Macy.

Anderson was added to the cast of the television series Beauty & the Beast in March 2012, playing the recurring role of Heather Chandler, Catherine's (Kristin Kreuk) younger sister. In May 2013, it was announced that Anderson had joined Ravenswood, a Pretty Little Liars spin-off, as Miranda Collins, a foster kid, who relies on her wits to cover her emotional scars. Prior to appearing in Ravenswood, Anderson appeared in the Pretty Little Liars episode "Grave New World", introducing her character, Miranda Collins. After the cancellation of Ravenswood, Anderson returned for the third season of Beauty & the Beast as a regular cast member.

Philanthropy
Anderson served as the first international spokesperson for Underwriters Laboratories Youth Safety Smart program and has participated in Disney's Friends for Change.

Personal life
In January 2018, Anderson married Roberto Paniagua. They have a daughter born July 2020.

Filmography

Film

Television

Music videos

References

External links

 

1990 births
Living people
21st-century American actresses
Actresses from Indiana
Female models from Indiana
American child actresses
American film actresses
American television actresses
American actresses of Filipino descent
People from Rochester, Indiana
Gymnasts from Indiana